Trey Montgomery (born 26 January 1987) is an American basketball head coach who is currently an assistant coach of Colgate Raiders under head coach, Matt Langel.

Coaching career 
On September 5, 2018, Penn Quakers' head coach, Steve Donahue, announced that there will be a reshuffling of the coaching roster. He heralded that Montgomery would be in his new roster. Montgomery, previously, was an assistant coach for the Eastern University Eagles. He described his tenure at Philadelphia as a leap of faith since there are more opportunities in the area than in Louisiana. Since he was the neophyte and youngest in the coaching rotation, he was assigned the responsibility of training the players and as well as checking up on their academic progresses.

References

External links
Trey Montgomery Coaching profile

1987 births
Living people
American men's basketball coaches
American men's basketball players
Guards (basketball)
Penn Quakers men's basketball coaches